Þórunn Erna Clausen (born 12 September 1975) is an Icelandic actress and songwriter.

Clausen is the daughter of Olympic athlete and dentist Haukur Clausen. She studied drama at the Webber Douglas Academy of Dramatic Art in London and graduated in 2001.

In 2004, Clausen won an Edda Award for her supporting role in the Icelandic film, Dís.

Clausen was married to the musician Sjonni Brink who together composed "Coming Home", Iceland's entry to the Eurovision Song Contest 2011. Brink died before his first performance in the third semi-final of Söngvakeppni Sjónvarpsins 2011. Clausen has also written entries for Iceland's selections in 2012, 2014, 2016, 2017 and 2018, with her song, "Our Choice", sung by Ari Ólafsson winning Söngvakeppnin 2018, therefore heading to the Eurovision Song Contest 2018.

Filmography

Film

Television

References

External links
 

1975 births
20th-century Icelandic actresses
21st-century Icelandic actresses
Alumni of the Webber Douglas Academy of Dramatic Art
Icelandic songwriters
Living people
Actresses from Reykjavík
Musicians from Reykjavík